Antonio Mantecón e Ibañez (born 1784 in Oaxaca City) was a Mexican clergyman and bishop for the Roman Catholic Archdiocese of Antequera, Oaxaca. He was ordained in 1821. He was appointed bishop in 1844. He died in 1852.

References 

1784 births
1852 deaths
Mexican Roman Catholic bishops
People from Oaxaca City